Membertou may refer to:

 Membertou, Nova Scotia, a First Nations community near Sydney, Nova Scotia, Canada.
 Henri Membertou, a sakamow (Grand Chief) of the Mi'kmaq First Nations tribe situated near Port Royal, Nova Scotia, Canada.